Single by 30 is an original romantic comedy series created by Wong Fu Productions. The series was launched on YouTube Red on August 24, 2016.  The focal point of the show follows the intertwining stories of two young adults Peter (Harry Shum Jr.) and Joanna (Kina Grannis), who once made a promise to get married if they were still single by the age of 30. On April 10, 2017, actor Harry Shum Jr. confirmed on his Twitter account that the series would not return for a second season.

Plot 
In their senior year of High school, Peter and Joanna make a pact to go to their senior dance together if they fail to invite their desired dates.  As this provides a back-up plan, this encourages them to invite a date despite the risk of being rejected. Joanna succeeds in wooing her date while Peter fails.  They meet up after the dance, and they make another pact: to get married if they are both still single at the age of 30. This will encourage them to take more chances and put themselves out in the world.

After high school, the two lose touch.  But after 12 years, the two coincidentally reconnect just before turning 30. They have both recently broken up with their separate partners. Disillusioned with life, they decide to reinstate their pact to ease the process of re-entering the dating game.  Their friends Mark and Chloe fall for each other and add a new dynamic to Peter's and Joanna's love lives.  However, Peter and Joanna fight mixed feelings as they traverse their relationships both with new partners and with each other.

Cast 
 Harry Shum Jr. as Peter Ma
 Kina Grannis as Joanna Taylor
 Hillary Anne Matthews as Chloe
 Eric Ochoa as Mark
 Manon Mathews as Lisa
 Alexandra Metz as Sarah
 Anna Akana as Grace
 Barry Rothbart as Ryan
 Ryan Higa as Trevor

The series features an ethnically "diverse group of actors to reflect the culture of Los Angeles, where the story is set."  NPR writes that it's a "solidly refreshing confection... when you throw in how rare it's been for diverse casts and Asian-American leading men in particular to find spots in widely released romantic comedies."

Production 
The series began with a pilot episode as a part of New Form Digital's Incubator Series 2. However, the pilot episode became so popular that YouTube adopted it as an original YouTube Red series and green-lit an entire 8 episode season.  Enabled by its budget from YouTube Red, Single by 30 marked the first time a Wong Fu Production has been written by anyone other than its founders.  Released as an official YouTube  Red series (Now YouTube Premium) on August 24, 2016, the first episode was free while the remaining episodes were only available with a YouTube Red subscription. On April 22, 2020, Wong Fu Productions announced via their YouTube channel that all episodes of the series were available for everyone to stream for free.

Episodes

Awards and nominations

Soundtrack 
George Shaw released the official soundtrack on June 16, 2015. Shaw both composed and performed the instrumental soundtrack for the series.

References

External links 
 Single by 30. YouTube playlist

Romantic comedy
YouTube Premium original series
2016 web series debuts
2016 web series endings